Poecilosclerida is an order of the demosponge class. It is the most speciose demosponge order with over 2200 species (World Porifera Database). It contains about 25 recognised families. They are characterised by having chelae microscleres, that is, the minute spicules scattered through the tissues, usually in the 10-60 μm range, have a shovel-like structure on the end.

Most of the families are viviparous with parenchymella larvae that are uniformly ciliated.

Families
As of 2018, the following families are recognized:

References